Blackford Creek is a stream in Daviess and Hancock counties, Kentucky, in the United States. It is a tributary of the Ohio River.

Blackford Creek was named for Joseph Blackford, a pioneer who was killed by Indians on the creek, and buried nearby. However, another stated origin is that Blackford Creek was named after a hunter who camped and hunted by the creek. Blackford Creek is also named as Otter Creek  and Muddy Creek

Features 
The creek sits on a 107 meter of elevation, with humid sub-tropical climate, this creek is described as a Stream. There are also many localities around Blackford Creek, such as mines and factory mills, See more here. Map of Blackford Creek here.

Bridge 
The Ray Road Bridge was a bridge that went across Blackford Creek, it was built in 1884 by the Smith Bridge Company of Toledo, Ohio. However, the bridge today has collapsed or demolished. Photos of the bridge here.

See also
List of rivers of Kentucky

References

Rivers of Daviess County, Kentucky
Rivers of Hancock County, Kentucky
Rivers of Kentucky